Kantian Review is a journal of philosophy, focusing on Immanuel Kant which publishes articles and reviews selected for their quality and relevance to current philosophical debate in relation to Kant's work. It was first published in March 1997 under editor Prof. Graham Bird of the University of Manchester.  Howard Williams of Aberystwyth, & Cardiff University and Richard Aquila are currently responsible for Kantian Review.

See also 
 List of philosophy journals

References

Cambridge University Press academic journals
History of philosophy journals
Journals about philosophers
Works about Immanuel Kant
Publications established in 1997
Triannual journals